Kimberly Sha Green Ruff  is an American singer.

Early years
A native of Vidalia, Georgia, Ruff is the fourth child born into the Lane-Green family. She has 4 sisters and two brothers.

Musical career 
She is a Mezzo-soprano with outstanding voice control, often compared to Whitney Houston. On June 26, 2009, Ruff released her debut solo album labeled Ready to Live (Mackim Records). It landed in five categories on the first round of the Stellar Awards ballot. She wrote and co-produced the entire album which officially garnered six Stellar Award nominations, New Artist of the Year and Contemporary Female Artist and won a Stellar for New Artist of the Year(Fan Favorite 2010). Ruff has been compared to songwriter Diane Warren for creating music with simple lyrics and melodies.

Pageants 
Kim was crowned Miss Black Teen of Vidalia, Georgia in 1988.

Personal life 
She married Mack Ruff in May 1994 and gave birth to a son Spencer Carrington on November 3, 2001. Spencer is featured on her album singing a duet titled Child of A King.

Discography

Albums

References 

1972 births
Living people
American activists
American gospel singers
African-American women singer-songwriters
African-American activists
Urban contemporary gospel musicians
American gospel musicians
21st-century American women singers
21st-century American singers
21st-century African-American women singers
20th-century African-American people
20th-century African-American women
Singer-songwriters from Georgia (U.S. state)